The women's 52 kilograms (half lightweight) competition at the 2006 Asian Games in Doha was held on 4 December at the Qatar SC Indoor Hall.

Schedule
All times are Arabia Standard Time (UTC+03:00)

Results
Legend
WO — Won by walkover

Main bracket

Repechage

References

Results

External links
 
 Official website

W52
Judo at the Asian Games Women's Half Lightweight
Asian W52